Semaq Beri may refer to:

 Semaq Beri language
 Semaq Beri people